Neidy Katherine Romero Mendoza (born 14 February 1995) is a Venezuelan footballer who plays as a defender. She has been a member of the Venezuela women's national team.

International career
Romero represented Venezuela at the 2014 South American U-20 Women's Championship. At senior level, she played the 2014 Copa América Femenina and the 2014 Central American and Caribbean Games.

References

1995 births
Living people
Women's association football defenders
Women's association football midfielders
Venezuelan women's footballers
Venezuela women's international footballers
Competitors at the 2014 Central American and Caribbean Games
Caracas F.C. (women) players
Cúcuta Deportivo footballers
Venezuelan expatriate women's footballers
Venezuelan expatriate sportspeople in Colombia
Expatriate women's footballers in Colombia
Venezuelan expatriate sportspeople in Ecuador
Expatriate women's footballers in Ecuador
People from Ciudad Guayana